The 2023 Challenger Concepción was a professional tennis tournament played on clay courts. It was the third edition of the tournament which was part of the 2023 ATP Challenger Tour. It took place in Concepción, Chile between 24 and 29 January 2023.

Singles main-draw entrants

Seeds

 1 Rankings are as of 16 January 2023.

Other entrants
The following players received wildcards into the singles main draw:
  Guido Andreozzi
  Gonzalo Lama
  Matías Soto

The following players received entry into the singles main draw as alternates:
  Andrea Collarini
  Mariano Navone

The following players received entry from the qualifying draw:
  Pedro Boscardin Dias
  Hernán Casanova
  Daniel Dutra da Silva
  João Lucas Reis da Silva
  Oriol Roca Batalla
  Juan Bautista Torres

The following player received entry as a lucky loser:
  Nicolás Mejía

Champions

Singles

 Federico Coria def.  Timofey Skatov 6–4, 6–3.

Doubles

 Guido Andreozzi /  Guillermo Durán def.  Luciano Darderi /  Oleg Prihodko 7–6(7–1), 6–7(3–7), [10–7].

References

2023 ATP Challenger Tour
2023 in Chilean sport
January 2023 sports events in South America